Andrew Josef Pannenberg (born September 21, 1998) is an American soccer player who plays as a goalkeeper for Houston Dynamo 2 in the MLS Next Pro.

Early years

Youth 
Pannenberg prepped at Ardrey Kell High School and spent nine years training at Charlotte Soccer Academy. Considered an outstanding local product, he was voted 2015 Charlotte Goalkeeper of the Year before signing an amateur contract with USL side Charlotte Independence in 2016. Prior to moving to college in 2017, Pannenberg made one appearance for Charlotte Eagles as the team won the Pro Development League national title in 2017.

College & amateur 
Pannenberg was recruited to play college soccer at Wake Forest University having turned down offers from Duke, Notre Dame and Charlotte as the number five ranked goalkeeper in the country by TopDrawerSoccer.com. He made one appearance for the Demon Deacons in his freshman 2017 season, earning the victory in a double-overtime 3–2 win over No. 6 Clemson, making three saves. He redshirted in 2018, seeing no game time having been unable to unseat junior starting goalkeeper Andreu Cases Mundet. Pannenberg returned as a redshirt sophomore in 2019 to start in 22 of Wake Forest's 23 matches, keeping nine clean sheets and earning All-ACC third team honors as the team reached the NCAA College Cup semi-finals. He also played in all nine of the team's matches during the 2020 season which was abbreviated due to the COVID-19 pandemic. In total, Pannenberg recorded 79 saves and 13 clean sheets in 32 appearances.

While at college, Pannenberg returned to play for Charlotte Eagles in 2018. In 2019, he signed for USL League Two side Flint City Bucks, appearing 16 times as the team finished second in the Great Lakes Division before making it all the way to, and winning, the National Championship with a 1–0 extra-time win over Reading United AC.

Professional career

Colorado Springs Switchbacks 
On January 21, 2021, Pannenberg was selected in the second round (49th overall) of the 2021 MLS SuperDraft by Orlando City, the second of two goalkeepers selected in the first two rounds of the draft. Having briefly spent time training with the team in preseason, Pannenberg was not signed by Orlando and eventually signed with USL Championship side Colorado Springs Switchbacks on April 9, 2021. He made his professional debut on May 14, 2021, starting in a 4–0 win over Sporting Kansas City II. Following the 2021 season, Pannenberg's contract option was declined by Colorado Springs.

Houston Dynamo 2
On February 19, 2022, Pannenberg signed with MLS Next Pro side Houston Dynamo 2 ahead of the league's inaugural season.

Career statistics

Club

Honors

College
Wake Forest Demon Deacons
ACC regular season: 2017
ACC Men's Soccer Tournament: 2017

Club
Charlotte Eagles
Pro Development League: 2017

Flint City Bucks
USL League Two: 2019

References

External links
 Andrew Pannenberg at Wake Forest Demon Deacons

1998 births
Living people
American soccer players
Association football goalkeepers
Charlotte Eagles players
Charlotte Independence players
Colorado Springs Switchbacks FC players
Flint City Bucks players
MLS Next Pro players
Orlando City SC draft picks
People from Charlotte, North Carolina
Soccer players from Charlotte, North Carolina
USL Championship players
USL League Two players
Wake Forest Demon Deacons men's soccer players